The 2015 Svenska Cupen Final was played on 17 May 2015. The match was played at Gamla Ullevi, the home ground of IFK Göteborg. It was the first time since 2011 that one of the final teams had a home ground instead of playing on the national stadium Friends Arena in Solna. It was the first time since 2000 that the final was played in Gothenburg and first time ever it was played on Gamla Ullevi. The final were the culmination of the 2014–15 Svenska Cupen. Allsvenskan clubs IFK Göteborg and Örebro SK contested the 2015 final. In Sweden the match was televised live on SVT.

IFK Göteborg won their seventh Svenska Cupen title after defeating Örebro SK 2–1.

Route to the final

Note: In all results below, the score of the finalist is given first.

Match

Details

Statistics

See also
 2014–15 Svenska Cupen

References

2015
Cup
IFK Göteborg matches
May 2015 sports events in Europe
2010s in Gothenburg
Sports competitions in Gothenburg
Örebro SK matches